The Lost Songs is a collection of demo recordings released by English pop rock band McFly in 2019 and 2020. The songs were originally intended for the band's sixth studio album which was then shelved. McFly recorded a full album in 2011 before focusing on supergroup McBusted.

One song from the collection was released per week leading up to the band's concert in the O2 Arena in London on 20 November 2019, marking the end of a three-year hiatus. The release of the songs was accompanied by a YouTube series of the same name, in which the band discussed one song per episode.

Tracklisting

References

2019 albums
McFly albums